Elizabeth or Liz Watson may refer to:
 Elizabeth Lowe Watson (1842–1927), American lecturer and suffragist 
 Lizzie Allen Harker (1863–1933), née Watson, English author
 Bessie Watson (1900–1992), Scottish child suffragette and piper
 Elizabeth Watson (police officer), American police chief
 Liz Watson (politician) (born 1975), American lawyer and former candidate for US Congress
 Liz Watson (netball) (born 1994), Australian netball player
 Elizabeth Watson, English person convicted of contempt of court, see Freeman on the land movement#Court cases
 Elizabeth Watson (Shortland Street), television character